Statistics of the Scottish Football League in season 1964–65.

Scottish League Division One

Scottish League Division Two

See also
1964–65 in Scottish football

References

 
Scottish Football League seasons